Vidya Vikas Institute of Engineering & Technology (VVIET) was started in the year 1997, as part of the mission of the Vidya Vikas Educational Trust.

Description 
VVIET is an engineering college recognized by the Government of Karnataka, and the All India Council of Technical Education (AICTE), New Delhi, affiliated to the Vishweswaraya Technological University (VTU), Belgaum, and governed by Vidya Vikas Educational Trust, which was opened by the famous Mysore Ex-Mayor Mr. Vasu, presently a Member of Legislative Assembly from Chamaraja Constituency, Mysore. Currently, the trust is monitored by one of his sons, Mr. Kaveesh Gowda V. Few of the famous celebrities are alumni of this college. Notable ones are Adarsh S (2013 CS pass out), who was a topper in those days is now Vice President of Citibank (USA). Another noted alumnus of VVIET is Dr.Safdar Hussain (2001 CS-First batch), completed his M.Tech from the Indian Institute of Technology, Hyderabad; Master of Science in Management from the University of Oxford, United Kingdom; Doctorate in Artificial Intelligence from Rennes School of Business, France; and is currently working as Chief Data & Analytics Officer for one of the Sovereign Wealth Funds in the UAE.

Academics programs
The Institution has six undergraduate programmes and two postgraduate programmes.

Undergraduate programmes

Postgraduate programmes

Other Institutions

Activities
Every year, annual college day is celebrated in the middle of the year; mostly during the months of April or May. Apart from this, many academic, co-academic and extra-academic activities are held throughout the year. A three-day state-level technical exhibition was also conducted in late 2012 in the Govt. of Karnataka - VVIET association. A state-level mathematics conference was also held at the camput in the end of May, 2013.

Campus
The entrance building is for concentrated undergraduate programmes which, at a furlong's distance, postgraduate disciplines are sheltered in a separate block, offset from main building. In the circumference, a hostel is also situated.
It has a freely spread open ground which acts as a stadium for cricket, football and concerts. Concerts for various college festivals are held in the same ground.

References

External links

 

Engineering colleges in Mysore
1997 establishments in Karnataka
Educational institutions established in 1997